The Opening Night is a 1927 American silent drama film directed by Edward H. Griffith and starring Claire Windsor, John Bowers and E. Alyn Warren.

Cast
 Claire Windsor as Carol Chandler 
 John Bowers as Jimmy Keane 
 E. Alyn Warren as Robert Chandler 
 Grace Goodall as Gertrude Ames 
 Bobbie Mack as Aaron Hinkle 
 William Welsh as Fisherman

References

External links
 

1927 films
1927 drama films
1920s English-language films
American silent feature films
Silent American drama films
American black-and-white films
Films directed by Edward H. Griffith
Columbia Pictures films
1920s American films